Liu Wen-hsiung may refer to:
Liu Wen-hsiung (1954–2017), Taiwanese politician, member of the Kuomintang and later the People First Party, served on the Legislative Yuan from 1999 to 2008
Liu Wen-hsiung (1941–1990), Taiwanese politician, member of the Democratic Progressive Party, served on the Legislative Yuan in 1990
Edwin Liu, Taiwanese businessman and engineer